The Minister of Defence of Nigeria is the Federal Executive Council cabinet official who leads the Defence Ministry of Nigeria. The Defence Minister's main responsibility is to manage all branches of the Armed Forces of the Federal Republic of Nigeria, to maintain a modern, competent, and professional military force for the protection of the national territory, maritime interests, airspace, and constitution of the Federal Republic of Nigeria.

Appointment
The Minister of Defence, is appointed by the President of Nigeria with the consent of the Senate.

Schedule of duties
 Maintaining a mission-ready military on land, sea and air. 
 Maintaining a proper balance in arms and men to meet the needs of internal and external security; 
 Enhance the capabilities of the country's Defence Industries.
 Ensure security in the African continent by the promotion of a collective defence system through bilateral, sub-regional and continental co-operation to ward off external aggression and to attain the African objective of the national foreign policy
 Participation in peacekeeping missions through the United Nations (UN), African Union (AU) and the Economic Community of West African States (ECOWAS).

Ministers of Defence

References

 Nigeria minister of defense Aliyu Gusau has not resigned

External links 
 defence website

Defence ministers of Nigeria
Minister of Defence